Desert Ridge High School (DRHS) was founded in 2002 in Mesa, Arizona, and is part of Gilbert Public Schools.

Overview 
For the 2018–19 school year Desert Ridge High School received a "B" school grade from the Arizona Department of Education.

In 2005 chemistry and engineering teacher Sylvia Grace was honored with a $25,000 Milken National Educator Award. She was the only Arizona recipient of the award among the 100 educators honored nationwide.

Desert Ridge's marching band is ranked among the top 5 Division III bands in the state, scoring a 69.6 at the 2009 State Marching Festival, and a 68.00 at the 2010 State Marching Festival. With this, the band also is in the top 3 best 3A bands in the state in 2018, scoring a 73.2625 at the AZMBA State Championships, and the top 10 Division 2 bands in the ABODA circuit.

Desert Ridge won the Class 5A baseball state championship in 2009 (Division II) and 2010 (Division I).

As of the 2017–18 school year Desert Ridge High School had a 28% participation rate for AP Tests and a college-ready index rating of 20.3 out of 100.

Alumni
Alex Barrett (born 1994), American football player
Jake Barrett, baseball player
D. J. Davidson, American football player

References

External links 
 Desert Ridge High School
  Desert Ridge High School on AIA Online 

Education in Gilbert, Arizona
Educational institutions established in 2002
High schools in Mesa, Arizona
Schools in Maricopa County, Arizona
2002 establishments in Arizona